Ghosts on Magnetic Tape is the name of the fourth studio album released by British musician, songwriter, and producer Steven Wilson under the pseudonym Bass Communion. It was created primarily from processing 78rpm records and piano sources. There was a limited edition of 300 copies available as a double CD including Andrew Liles' reconstruction disc.

Track listing

Limited edition
CD 2 – Andrew Liles Reconstruction
 Part I – 9:17
 Part II – 11:04
 Part III – 9:56
 Part IV – 10:18
 Part V – 16:33

2LP
Side A
 Ghosts on Magnetic Tape I – 12:45
 Ghosts on Magnetic Tape II – 7:02
Side B
 Ghosts on Magnetic Tape III – 10:15
 Ghosts on Magnetic Tape IV – 8:17
Side C
 Ghosts on Magnetic Tape V – 18:48
Side D
 Ghosts on Magnetic Tape out-take – 16:04

Personnel

 Steven Wilson – All Instruments
 Theo Travis – Flute on 5
 Jonathan Coleclough – Additional sample material

Other

 Carl Glover (for Aleph) – Graphic Design and photography

Release history

References

External links
Bass Communion Site at Steven Wilson Headquarters

2004 albums
Bass Communion albums